Jean-François Pintat (29 July 1923 – 14 June 1990) was a French engineer and politician. Pintat was the Senator for Gironde from 1971 to 1990.

Early life 
Jean-François Pintat was born on 29 July 1923 in Bordeaux, France. Pintat was an engineer. In 1965, Pintat hired Roland Etienne Blais at his driver, Blais would later become the mayor of Soulac-sur-Mer, where Pintat resided.

Senate 
Pintat was elected as the Senator for the department of Gironde on 26 September 1971. From 17 July 1979 to 23 July 1984, Pintat served as Vice-Chair of the Liberal and Democratic Group in the European Parliament.

He was re-elected to the Senate on 28 September 1980, and again on 24 September 1989.

On 14 June 1990, at the age of 66, Pintat died at his home in Soulac-sur-Mer, Gironde, France following a period of serious illness.

Personal life 
Pintat had a son, Xavier Pintat, who became mayor of Soulac-sur-Mer, an engineer, and a Senator for Gironde.

References

Notes

Citations

External links 
 Portrait of Jean-François Pintat from the European Parliament Multimedia Centre

1923 births
1990 deaths
Politicians from Bordeaux
French Senators of the Fifth Republic